Abdelsalam Elkhadrawy (born 27 October 1962) is an Egyptian Government Official And Member of the Egyptian Parliament and Deputy of the Energy and Environment Committee of the Egyptian Parliament.

Biography 
Eng. Abdelsalam Elkhadrawy is A Member of the Egyptian Parliament and Deputy of the Energy and Environment Committee of the Egyptian Parliament. And Chairman of the Board of Directors of Al-Safa Private Azhari Institutes Complex. And Head of the Dialogue Center for Political and Media Studies. And Founder of Arabco for Urban Development, President of the People's Association for Development and Environmental Protection.

Political Activities 
he has worked in public and political work since 1988 till now.

 Member of the Local Council, East Shubra Al-Khaimah District, 1988 - 1992
 Chairman of the Housing Committee 1988 - 1992
 Member of a local council in East Shubra Al-Khaimah, 1992-1997
 Member of the Local Council of Qalyubia Governorate, 1997-2002
 Member of the Shura Council (and a member of the Education and Scientific Research Committee) 2007-2011
 Member of Parliament and Deputy of the Energy and Environment Committee from 2015 until now.

Awards 

 Honoured by the General Engineers Syndicate.
 Honoured by the teachers union.
 He was chosen from among the Russian delegation to Russia.
 Participate in the Legislative Council elections.
 The Shield of Parliamentary Excellence.

References 

Members of the Parliament of Egypt
Political Union of Economists politicians
Living people
1962 births